Gabriel's Inferno is an erotic romance novel by an anonymous Canadian author under the pen name Sylvain Reynard. The story was first published in novel format in 2011 by Omnific Publishing, with further publishing rights to the series being purchased by Berkley Books. The work was first published on 4 September 2012, along with the second book in the series, Gabriel's Rapture.

The series has been compared to Fifty Shades of Grey because both originated as Twilight fan fiction, with the International Business Times reporting that Gabriel's Inferno differs in that it bears "few similarities to the story that inspired it". The novel was originally published online as a Twilight fan fiction entitled The University of Edward Masen (Edward Masen being Edward Cullen's human name) under the pen name of Sebastien Robichaud. Gabriel's Inferno and its sequels appeared on The New York Times Best Seller list. A film adaptation was released on the streaming service Passionflix. The film was cut into three parts; the first part of the film was released on 29 May 2020.

Plot
Gabriel Owen Emerson is a brilliant and enigmatic professor of Dante studies at the University of Toronto. His cold, aloof exterior masks dark secrets he successfully hides, though he has never overcome them. A lovely, intelligent graduate student in his seminar triggers a dim memory - one he cannot place, but which is the key to the happiness he long thought was impossible.

Julianne Mitchell, a compassionate, kind young woman, is still struggling to overcome a childhood of neglect and abuse. When she enrolls at the University of Toronto, she knows she will see someone from her past - a man she met once, in an encounter she has never forgotten. Gabriel cannot recall what Julia knows: that they have a shared history rooted in an important moment of their lives.

The story unfolds around the electrifying connection between Gabriel and Julia and their increasingly passionate affair. Gabriel sees her unconditional love as his path to salvation even as he acknowledges his selfishness in doing so. Julia struggles with her own self-worth as she grows to trust Gabriel's feelings for her. Determined to capture the happiness that eluded them when they parted years ago, they must defy their own painful pasts as well as obstacles which now conspire to keep them apart.

Development
When initially writing the novel, Reynard tried to "explore the themes of redemption and love with respect to two flawed people." The author also chose not to focus on the "mechanics of sex," viewing it as potentially detracting from the "mysterious and sometimes transcendent aspects of it." Reynard drew inspiration for the novel from the relationship between Dante and Beatrice Portinari.

Reynard has stated that the series was written as fanfiction as "an opportunity to try my hand at fiction writing."

Reception
Fan reaction to the series has been positive, with some readers staging Inferno-inspired tours of Toronto. When Reynard chose to release the series for publication, some readers expressed disapproval over fanfiction being published for profit akin to the backlash Fifty Shades of Grey also received. As of October 2012, the book and its sequel were numbers 12 and 17 on The New York Times paperback trade fiction list.

Further books
The second book in the series, Gabriel's Rapture, was released alongside Gabriel's Inferno on 4 September 2012. A third entry in the series, Gabriel's Redemption was released on 3 December 2013.  It also leads to a supernatural spin-off series centering a character introduced in Gabriel's Redemption,  who is later revealed as a vampire known as The Prince, and his lover, Raven Wood, beginning with the novel The Raven.  The author revealed on his facebook page in November 2017 that he was currently writing the fourth novel in this series. The fourth novel, Gabriel's Promise was released on January 7, 2020.

Film adaptation
In November 2019, it was announced that filming for a Gabriel's Inferno movie had commenced in Syracuse, New York, with Melanie Zanetti and Giulio Berruti playing Julia and Gabriel and directed and produced by Tosca Musk. The film was cut into 3 parts. The first part of Gabriel's Inferno premiered on Tosca's streaming service Passionflix on 29 May 2020; Part II was released on 31 July 2020. The last part was released on 19 November.

Filming for the sequel Gabriel's Rapture began in January until February 2020 but production had to be halted due to the COVID-19 pandemic. Principal production for Gabriel's Rapture resumed on 9 March 2021 in Florence; Italy, and completed in early June in Belize. During a live video chat on Instagram with producer & director Tosca Musk in March, she confirmed that like the first movie Gabriel's Inferno, the sequel will also be cut into multiple parts due to the very long duration of the film. Part 1 of Gabriel's Rapture was released on 24 November 2021.  
On 16 December 2021 during a live video on Instagram, Tosca confirmed that part 2 of Gabriel's Rapture will be released sometime in March 2022. In the same video she also mentioned that filming for the second sequel based on the third book Gabriel's Redemption is scheduled to begin sometime in late summer or fall in 2022. On 14 February Passionflix released a teaser for part 2 of Gabriel's Rapture, confirming that part 2 will be released on 24 March 2022. On 23 June 2022 Passionflix released a teaser for part 3 of Gabriel's Rapture confirming that part 3 will be released on 12 August 2022. On 29 July Passionflix released the official trailer for part 3.

Filming for the second sequel Gabriel's Redemption officially began on 24 October 2022 and concluded in March 2023.

See also
Fifty Shades of Grey
Beautiful Bastard

References

External links
Gabriel's Inferno IMDB
Sylvain Reynard

Canadian romance novels
Erotic novels
2011 Canadian novels
Novels set in Toronto
Fan fiction works
Works based on Twilight (novel series)
Works published under a pseudonym
Works of unknown authorship
Novels about academic scandals
Campus novels